"The Attack" is a 1966 TV play broadcast by the Australian Broadcasting Corporation. It was shot at the ABC Studios in Southbank Melbourne.

Premise
During the Civil War, Yvette is torn between the man she loves and her country.

Cast
Anne Charleston as Yvette
Jeffrey Hodgson
Brian James
George Mallaby
Gerard Kennedy
Telford Jackson

See also
List of television plays broadcast on Australian Broadcasting Corporation (1960s)

References

External links
The Attack at Ausstage

Australian television plays
Australian Broadcasting Corporation original programming
English-language television shows
Australian live television shows
Black-and-white Australian television shows
1966 television plays